The Buddhist Digital Resource Center (BDRC), formerly Tibetan Buddhist Resource Center (TBRC), is a 501(c)(3) nonprofit organization dedicated to seeking out, preserving, organizing, and disseminating Buddhist literature. Joining digital technology with scholarship, BDRC ensures that the ancient wisdom and cultural treasures of the Buddhist literary tradition are not lost, but are made available for future generations. BDRC is committed to seeking out, preserving, organizing, and disseminating Buddhist literature. Founded in 1999 by E. Gene Smith with the help of the Tibetan translator Michele Martin, BDRC is located in Cambridge, Massachusetts, and hosts a digital library of the largest collection of digitized Tibetan texts in the world. Current programs focus on the preservation of texts in Pali, Chinese, Sanskrit, and Tibetan.

BDRC's Harvard Square headquarters facilitates its ongoing cooperative relationships with Harvard University. BDRC also has international offices in New Delhi, India and Kathmandu, Nepal, and is linked to the E. Gene Smith Library at Southwest University for Nationalities in Chengdu, China.

History

In the early 1960s, while working on his PhD at the University of Washington, E. Gene Smith studied with the Venerable Dezhung Rinpoche. In 1964, Dezhung Rinpoche encouraged Smith to move to India in order to seek out and study Tibetan books more directly. He gave Smith letters of introduction to show to the lamas living among the Tibetan diaspora.

In 1968 the U.S. Library of Congress hired Smith as a field director in New Delhi where he worked on the Food for Peace humanitarian effort Public Law 480. Through the program, Smith began to copy and print thousands of Tibetan texts while keeping a version of each one for his own collection. He moved from India to Indonesia in 1985 and then Egypt, along with his collection of 12,000 volumes of texts.

In 1997 Smith retired from the Library of Congress and began working to implement his vision of making the preserved texts accessible using the new scanning and digitization technologies that were, at that time, just beginning to become available. In 1999 with friends including Tibetan translator Michele Martin and Harvard professor and fellow Tibetologist Leonard van der Kuijp, he founded the Tibetan Buddhist Resource Center (TBRC) in Cambridge, Massachusetts. Smith's texts from India that were digitized at TBRC became the foundation for Tibetan studies in the United States.

In 2002 with the support of Shelley and Donald Rubin, TBRC moved to New York City, where Smith became an advisor to the Rubin Museum of Art.  Major grants from the Patricia and Peter Gruber Foundation, Khyentse Foundation, and the Shelley and Donald Rubin Foundation allowed TBRC to acquire a significant number of texts, develop its archiving system, and add more professional staff. Starting as technical director in 2001, Jeff Wallman was personally selected by Smith to be executive director and was appointed by the board of directors in 2009.

Gene Smith died on December 16, 2010. TBRC had scanned 7 million pages of Tibetan texts at the time of his death.

In 2017, TBRC announced the expansion of institutional mission to include the preservation of texts in languages beyond Tibetan, including Sanskrit, Pali and Chinese. To reflect this expansion, they have officially changed organizational name from Tibetan Buddhist Resource Center to Buddhist Digital Resource Center (BDRC). In 2017, BDRC will begin preserving and making accessible texts in languages beyond Tibetan, starting with Pali, Sanskrit, and Chinese.

BDRC's Work 

BDRC seeks out and preserves undiscovered texts, organizes them into a library catalog system, and disseminates the library online and to remote locations on hard drives so anyone can read, print, or share the texts. Texts are cataloged by work, genre, subject, person, and place.

Currently, the collection contains more than 26,000 works (72,000 volumes, totaling nearly 15 million pages) of Tibetan texts. Scholars and students are able to study the physical qualities of the texts since the scans are searchable and zoomable.

Between 500,000 and 1,000,000 pages are added every year.

BDRC's work was recognized by the 17th Karmapa Ogyen Trinley Dorje in a letter offering his support, gratitude, and prayers. Gene Smith's life and TBRC were the subject of the 2012 documentary Digital Dharma, directed by Dafna Yachin of Lunchbox Communications. Variety film critic John Anderson described the film as, "A divinely inspired gift... also an affectionate tribute to the late E. Gene Smith, the scholar, librarian and ex-Mormon who waged a 50-year struggle to save the endangered texts of Tibetan Buddhism."

BDRC and Harvard 

In summer 2012 BDRC relocated back to Harvard Square in Cambridge, Massachusetts, where the staff hand-picked by Smith continues its ongoing mission to preserve and provide access to Tibetan literature.

In cooperation with the Harvard University Open Access Project (HOAP), BDRC is making its entire library completely open access. BDRC also coordinates internships with graduate students from Harvard Divinity School and the Department of South Asian Studies at Harvard.

References

External links
 Buddhist Digital Archives
 Digital Dharma Official Website
 Tibetan Buddhist Resource Center at Google Cultural Institute

Bibliographic databases and indexes
Buddhist organizations based in the United States
Discipline-oriented digital libraries
Tibetan Buddhist literature
Digital humanities
American digital libraries
Asian-American culture in Massachusetts
Harvard Square
Digital humanities projects
Digital history projects
Public domain databases